The 1974 Alaska gubernatorial election took place on November 5, 1974, for the post of Governor of Alaska. Republican challenger and mayor of Bristol Bay Borough Jay Hammond narrowly beat Democratic incumbent Bill Egan in a close race that was forced into a recount to verify the results.  The formation of the new Alaskan Independence Party was considered to have a large impact on the race. Hammond had defeated former governors Wally Hickel and Keith Harvey Miller for the Republican nomination, while Egan defeated Eben Hopson and Don Wright for the Democratic nomination.

Results

References

Gubernatorial
1974
Alaska
November 1974 events in the United States